

Events

January
 January 1 - the Emergency Alert System is introduced in the United States of America
 January 11 – Turkey threatens Cyprus on account of a deal to buy Russian S-300 missiles, prompting the Cypriot Missile Crisis.
 January 17 – A Delta II rocket carrying a military GPS payload explodes, shortly after liftoff from Cape Canaveral.
 January 18 – In northwest Rwanda, Hutu militia members kill 6 Spanish aid workers and three soldiers, and seriously wound another.
 January 19 – Yasser Arafat returns to Hebron after more than 30 years, and joins celebrations over the handover of the last Israeli-controlled West Bank city.
 January 20 – Bill Clinton is sworn in for a second term as President of the United States. 
 January 23 – Madeleine Albright becomes the first female Secretary of State of the United States, after confirmation by the United States Senate.

February
 February 4
 On their way to Lebanon, two Israeli troop-transport helicopters collide, killing all 73 on board.
 After at first contesting the results, Serbian President Slobodan Milošević recognizes opposition victories in the November 1996 elections.
 A magnitude 6.5 earthquake strikes North Khorasan province, Iran, killing 88 people and injuring 1,948.
 February 10 – Sandline affair: Australian newspapers publish stories that the government of Papua New Guinea has brought mercenaries onto Bougainville Island.
 February 13 – STS-82: Tune-up and repair work on the Hubble Space Telescope is started by astronauts from the Space Shuttle Discovery.
 February 28 – North Hollywood shootout: Two robbers, wearing kevlar body armor, and armed with AK-47s containing armor-piercing bullets, injure 17 police officers and civilians in a gun battle. The incident sparks debate on the appropriate firepower for United States patrol officers to have available in similar situations in the future.

March
 March 4 – U.S. President Bill Clinton bans federal funding for any research on human cloning.
 March 7 – In Sri Lanka, the Tamil Tigers overrun a military base and kill over 100 Sri Lankan troops. 
 March 13
 India's Missionaries of Charity chooses Sister Nirmala, to succeed Mother Teresa as its leader.
 The National People's Congress of the People's Republic of China creates a new Chongqing Municipality, out of part of Sichuan.
 March 14 – A study of gender reassignment of a boy who lost his penis to a botched circumcision is refuted by a follow-up study. The supposedly successful outcome had been widely cited as proof that gender was determined by nurture, yet the patient, David Reimer, was deeply unhappy and had returned to his original gender by the age of 15, thus indicating the opposite thesis.
 March 16 – Sandline affair: On Bougainville Island, soldiers of commander Jerry Singirok arrest Tim Spicer and his mercenaries of the Sandline International.
 March 18 – The tail of a Russian An-24 charter plane breaks off while en route to Turkey, causing the plane to crash, killing all 50 on board, and resulting in the grounding of all An-24s.
 March 21 – In Zaire, Étienne Tshisekedi is appointed prime minister; he ejects supporters of Mobutu Sese Seko from his cabinet.
 March 22 – The Comet Hale–Bopp makes its closest approach to Earth.
 March 24 – The 69th Academy Awards, hosted by Billy Crystal, are held at the Shrine Auditorium in Los Angeles, with The English Patient winning Best Picture. During the event, the DVD format is launched in the United States.
 March 24 – 26 – In San Diego, 39 Heaven's Gate cultists commit mass suicide at their compound.
 March 26 – Julius Chan resigns as prime minister of Papua New Guinea, effectively ending the Sandline affair.

April
 April 3 – The Thalit massacre in Algeria: all but 1 of the 53 inhabitants of Thalit are killed by guerrillas.
 April 14
 Fire breaks out in a pilgrim camp on the Plain of Mena,  from Mecca; 343 die.
 Former S.S. Captain Erich Priebke is retried; on July 22 he is sentenced to fifteen years in prison.
 April 18 – The Red River of the North breaks through dikes and floods Grand Forks, North Dakota, and East Grand Forks, Minnesota, causing US$2 billion in damage.
 April 21 – A Pegasus rocket carries the remains of 24 people into earth orbit, in the first space burial.
 April 22
 Haouch Khemisti massacre: 93 villagers are killed in Algeria.
 A 126-day hostage crisis at the residence of the Japanese ambassador in Lima, Peru.
 April 23 – 42 villagers are killed in the Omaria massacre in Algeria.
 April 29
 The Organisation for the Prohibition of Chemical Weapons (OPCW), CWC treaty enters into force.
 Two trains crash at Hunan, China; 126 are killed.

May
 May 1 - Tony Blair becomes Prime Minister of the United Kingdom, as the Labour Party wins the 1997 United Kingdom general election and returns to government for the first time in 18 years.
 May 3 – Katrina and the Waves win the Eurovision Song Contest 1997 for the United Kingdom with "Love Shine a Light".
 May 9 – The first genetically modified three-parent baby is born.
 May 10 – The 7.3  Qayen earthquake strikes eastern Iran with a maximum Mercalli intensity of X (Extreme). At least 1,567 were killed and 2,300 were injured.
 May 11 – IBM's Deep Blue defeats Garry Kasparov in the last game of the rematch, the first time a computer beats a chess World champion in a match.
 May 12
The Russian–Chechen Peace Treaty is signed.
An F1-rated tornado strikes downtown Miami, causing $525,000 in damages. Pictures and videos of this tornado made news headlines around the world.
 May 15 – The United States government acknowledges existence of the "Secret War" in Laos (1953–1975) during the Vietnam War, and dedicates the Laos Memorial in honor of Hmong and other "Secret War" veterans.
 May 16
 President Mobutu Sese Seko is exiled from Zaire.
 U.S. President Bill Clinton issues a formal apology to the surviving victims of the Tuskegee Study of Untreated Syphilis in the Negro Male and their families.
 May 17 – Troops of Laurent Kabila march into Kinshasa.
 May 23 – Mohammad Khatami wins the 1997 Iranian presidential election and becomes the first Iranian Reformist president.
 May 25 – A military coup in Sierra Leone replaces President Ahmad Tejan Kabbah with Major Johnny Paul Koroma.
 May 27 – The second-deadliest tornado of the 1990s hits in Jarrell, Texas, killing 27 people.
 May 31 – The 13-kilometer Confederation Bridge, the world's longest bridge spanning ice-covered waters, opens between Prince Edward Island and New Brunswick, Canada.

June
 June 1 
 Socialist Party-led Centre-left coalition won the second-round in 1997 French legislative elections, began with the third Cohabitation (1997–2002).
 Hugo Banzer wins the Presidential elections in Bolivia.
 June 2 – In Denver, Colorado, Timothy McVeigh is convicted on 15 counts of murder and conspiracy for his role in the 1995 Oklahoma City bombing.
 June 10 – Khmer Rouge leader Pol Pot orders the killing of his defense chief, Son Sen, and 11 of Sen's family members, before Pol Pot flees his northern stronghold.
 June 11 – In the United Kingdom, the House of Commons votes for a total ban on handguns.
 June 13 – A jury sentences Timothy McVeigh to death for his part in the 1995 Oklahoma City bombing.
 June 16 – About 50 people are killed in the Daïat Labguer (M'sila) massacre in Algeria.
June 21 – The Women's National Basketball Association (WNBA) plays its first game at The Great Western Forum in Los Angeles. 
 June 25
 A massive eruption of the Soufrière Hills volcano on the island of Montserrat leads to evacuation and eventual abandonment of the capital, Plymouth.
 An unmanned Progress spacecraft collides with the Russian space station Mir.
 June 26 – Bertie Ahern is appointed as the 10th Taoiseach of the Republic of Ireland and Mary Harney is appointed as the 16th, and first female, Tánaiste, after their parties, Fianna Fáil and the Progressive Democrats respectively, win the 1997 General Election.
 June 26 – Bloomsbury Publishing publishes J. K. Rowling's Harry Potter and the Philosopher's Stone in London.

July
 July – The 1997 Central European flood occurs across Poland, Germany, and the Czech Republic.
 July 1 – The United Kingdom hands sovereignty of Hong Kong to the People's Republic of China.
 July 2 – The Bank of Thailand floats the baht, triggering the Asian financial crisis.
 July 4 – NASA's Pathfinder space probe lands on the surface of Mars.
 July 5 
 In Cambodia, Hun Sen of the Cambodian People's Party overthrows Norodom Ranariddh in a coup.
 The Egyptian Islamic Group announces a cessation-of-violence initiative.
 July 8 – NATO invites the Czech Republic, Hungary, and Poland to join the alliance in 1999.
 July 10 – In London, scientists report their DNA analysis findings from a Neanderthal skeleton, which support the out of Africa theory of human evolution, placing an "African Eve" at 100,000 to 200,000 years ago.
 July 11 – Thailand's worst hotel fire at Pattaya kills 90.
 July 13 – The remains of Che Guevara are returned to Cuba for burial, alongside some of his comrades. Guevara and his comrades were executed on October 9 1967 in Bolivia.
 July 15 – Spree killer Andrew Cunanan shoots fashion designer Gianni Versace dead outside Versace's Miami Beach residence.
 July 17 – The F. W. Woolworth Company closes after 117 years in business.
 July 25 – K. R. Narayanan is sworn in as India's 10th president and the first member of the Dalit caste to hold this office.
 July 27 – About 50 are killed in the Si Zerrouk massacre in Algeria.
 July 30 – 18 people are killed in the Thredbo landslide in the Snowy Mountains resort in Australia.

August
 August 1 – Boeing and McDonnell Douglas complete a merger.
 August 3 – Between 40 and 76 villagers are killed in the Oued El-Had and Mezouara massacre in Algeria.
 August 3 – 11 – Two of the three islands of the Union of the Comoros – Anjouan and Mohéli – attempt to revert to colonial rule by France. The plan fails when the French government of President Jacques Chirac refuses to recolonize them, resulting in the two islands being reintegrated into the Comoros over the next two years.
 August 6 – Korean Air Flight 801 crash lands west of Guam International Airport, resulting in the deaths of 228 people.
 August 13 - Trey Parker and Matt Stone's South Park aired its first episode on Comedy Central, becoming one of the most infamous and celebrated sitcoms ever made.
 August 20 – More than 60 are killed, 15 kidnapped in the Souhane massacre in Algeria.
 August 26
 60–100 are killed in the Beni Ali massacre in Algeria.
 The Independent International Commission on Decommissioning is set up in Northern Ireland, as part of a peace process.
 August 29 – Over 98 (and possibly up to 400) are killed in the Rais massacre in Algeria.
 August 31 – Death of Diana, Princess of Wales: Diana, Princess of Wales is taken to a hospital after a car accident shortly after midnight, in the Pont de l'Alma road tunnel in Paris. She is pronounced dead at 4:00 am.

September
 September 1 – Dublin Regulation on treatment of applications for right of asylum under European Union law first comes into force.
 September 5
 Over 87 are killed in the Beni Messous massacre in Algeria.
 The International Olympic Committee picks Athens, Greece, to be the host city for the 2004 Summer Olympics.
 September 6 – The funeral of Diana, Princess of Wales, takes place at Westminster Abbey, watched by over two billion people worldwide.
 September 11 – Scotland votes in favour of a devolved Parliament, forming the Scottish Parliament less than two years later
 September 15 – The Norwegian parliamentary election was held in Norway.
 September 17 – Iraq disarmament crisis: While waiting for access to a site, UNSCOM inspectors witness and videotape Iraqi guards moving files, burning documents, and dumping waste cans into a nearby river.
 September 18
 Al-Qaeda carries out a terrorist attack in Mostar, Bosnia and Herzegovina.
 Wales votes in favour of devolution and the formation of a National Assembly for Wales.
 September 19 – 53 are killed in the Guelb El-Kebir massacre in Algeria.
 September 21
 The Islamic Salvation Army, the Islamic Salvation Fronts' armed wing, declares a unilateral ceasefire in Algeria.
 St. Olaf's Church, a stone church from the 16th century in Tyrvää, Finland, is burnt down.
 September 25 – Iraq disarmament crisis: UNSCOM inspector Dr. Diane Seaman catches several Iraqi men sneaking out the back door of an inspection site, with log books for the creation of prohibited bacteria and chemicals.
 September 26
 Garuda Indonesia Flight 152 crashes while on approach to Medan, North Sumatra, during the 1997 Southeast Asian haze, killing all 234 people on board. This becomes the deadliest aviation accident in Indonesian history.
 An earthquake strikes the Italian regions of Umbria and Marche, causing part of the Basilica of St. Francis at Assisi to collapse.

October
 October 2 – British scientists Moira Bruce and John Collinge, with their colleagues, independently show that the new variant form of the Creutzfeldt–Jakob disease is the same disease as Bovine spongiform encephalopathy.
 October 3 – The President of Paraguay, Juan Carlos Wasmosy, orders the arrest of political opponent Lino Oviedo.
 October 4 – Loomis Fargo Bank Robbery: The second largest cash robbery in U.S. history ($17.3 million, mostly in small bills) occurs at the Charlotte, North Carolina office of Wells Fargo. An FBI investigation eventually results in 24 convictions and the recovery of approximately 95% of the stolen cash.
 October 10 – Uruguay's worst air disaster occurs when Austral Líneas Aéreas Flight 2553 crashes near Nuevo Berlín, killing all 74 on board.
 October 12 – Sidi Daoud massacre: 43 are killed at a false roadblock in Algeria.
 October 15
 Andy Green sets the first supersonic land speed record for the ThrustSSC team, led by Richard Noble of the UK. ThrustSSC goes through the flying mile course at Black Rock Desert, Nevada at an average speed of 1,227.985 km/h (763.035 mph).
 NASA launches the Cassini–Huygens probe to Saturn.
 October 16 – The first color photograph appears on the front page of The New York Times.
 October 17 – The remains of Che Guevara are laid to rest with full military honours in a specially built mausoleum in the city of Santa Clara, Cuba, where he had won the decisive battle of the Cuban Revolution 39 years before.
 October 22 – Danish escaped criminal Steen Christensen robs the Hotel Palace in Helsinki, Finland, killing two police officers while evading capture.
 October 29 – Iraq disarmament crisis: Iraq says it will begin shooting down Lockheed U-2 surveillance planes being used by UNSCOM inspectors.

November
 November 11 – Telecom companies WorldCom and MCI Communications announce a US$37 billion merger to form MCI WorldCom, the largest merger in U.S. history.
 November 12 – Mary McAleese is elected the eighth President of Ireland in succession to Mary Robinson, the first time in the world that one woman has succeeded another as elected head of state.
 November 13 – Ramzi Yousef is found guilty of masterminding the 1993 World Trade Center bombing.
 November 17 – In Luxor, Egypt, 62 people are killed by 6 Islamic militants outside the Temple of Hatshepsut.
 November 19 – In Des Moines, Iowa, Bobbi McCaughey gives birth to septuplets in the second known case where all seven babies are born alive, and the first in which all survive infancy.
 November 27
 NASA's Tropical Rainfall Measuring Mission is launched, the start of the satellite component of the Clouds and the Earth's Radiant Energy System.
 The 71st Annual Macy's Thanksgiving Day Parade was held in New York City with high winds gusting up to 50 mph which lead to The Cat in the Hat balloon crashing into the lamppost between 72nd and Central Park West injuring 4 people, in addition, The Pink Panther balloon went out of control shortly after reaching Broadway and was shredded by a stoplight and a row of lampposts at 4 Times Square in which the balloon was removed. The balloon of Barney was torn in the side by a lamppost between 55th and Broadway which the balloon would later be removed and the accident would be viral in 2013 in a video titled, “Thanksgiving ‘97. The Day Barney Was Killed.” The balloon of Quik Bunny had his left ear poked by a tree while starting the parade, he continued with a deflated ear until he reached Times Square, when his hat was ripped open by a stoplight caused by high winds, the balloon would continue until 36th Street when it was removed from the lineup.

December
 December 1 – In the Indian state of Bihar, Ranvir Sena attacks the CPI(ML) Party Unity stronghold Lakshmanpur-Bathe, killing 63 lower caste people.
 December 3 – In Ottawa, Ontario, Canada, representatives from 121 countries sign a treaty prohibiting the manufacture and deployment of anti-personnel land mines. However, the United States, the People's Republic of China, Russia, South Korea and 32 other nations do not sign and/or ratify the treaty. 
 December 10 – The capital of Kazakhstan is moved from Almaty to Astana.
 December 11 – The Kyoto Protocol is adopted by a United Nations committee.
 December 16 – In Japan, over 700 children suffer epileptic attacks due to an episode of the anime Pokémon.
 December 18 – In Australia, 20th Century Fox releases a feature-length film about a children's group named The Wiggles called The Wiggles Movie.
 December 19
 Janet Jagan (widow of Cheddi Jagan) takes office in Guyana.
 James Cameron's Titanic, the then highest-grossing film of all time, premieres in the U.S.
 SilkAir Flight 185 crashes into the Musi River, near Palembang in Indonesia, killing 104.
 December 21 – Brazil beats Australia 6–0 in the Confederations Cup final.
 December 24 – 50–100 villagers are killed in the Sid El-Antri massacre in Algeria.
 December 27 – Ulster loyalist paramilitary leader Billy Wright is assassinated in Northern Ireland, inside Long Kesh prison.
 December 29 – Hong Kong begins to kill all the chickens within its territory (1.25 million) to stop the spread of a potentially deadly influenza strain.
 December 30 – Wilaya of Relizane massacres of December 30, 1997: In the worst incident in Algeria's insurgency, 400 are killed from four villages in the wilaya of Relizane.

Births

January

 January 1 
 Chidozie Awaziem, Nigerian footballer
 Chloé Dygert, American professional cyclist
 January 2 – Gabriel Carlsson, Swedish ice hockey player
 January 4 – Pauline Schäfer, German gymnast
 January 5 – Mikhail Vorobyev, Russian ice hockey player
 January 7 
 Lamar Jackson, American football player 
 Ozzie Albies, professional baseball player 
 January 9 – Elvira Herman, Belarusian athlete
 January 11 – Cody Simpson, Australian singer-songwriter
 January 12 – Felix Sandström, Swedish ice hockey player
 January 13
 Egan Bernal, Colombian road bicycle racer
 Connor McDavid, Canadian ice hockey player
 January 14
 Francesco Bagnaia, Italian motorcycle racer
 Denice Zamboanga, Filipina mixed martial artist 
 January 15 – Valentina Zenere, Argentine actress, model, and singer
 January 17 
 Jake Paul, American boxer, actor and social media personality
 Maxwell Frost, American activist and politician
 January 18 – Denis Malgin, Swiss ice hockey player
 January 20 – Blueface, American rapper
 January 21
 Jeremy Shada, American actor, voice actor, singer and musician
Ilia Topuria, German-Georgian mixed martial artist
 Yang Yang, Chinese paralympic swimmer
 January 23
 Sophie Hahn, English paralympic sprinter
 Ramadan Sobhi, Egyptian footballer
 Gudaf Tsegay, Ethiopian middle-distance runner
 January 25 – Noah Hanifin, American ice hockey player
 January 29 – Jack Roslovic, American ice hockey player
 January 30 – Shim Suk-hee, South Korean speed skater
 January 31 – Melvyn Richardson, French handball player

February

 February 1 - Jihyo, South Korean singer
 February 2 – Jaheel Hyde, Jamaican sprinter
 February 8 – Kathryn Newton, American actress
 February 10
 Josh Jackson, American basketball player
 Lilly King, American swimmer
 Chloë Grace Moretz, American actress 
 Rozaliya Nasretdinova, Russian swimmer
 February 11 
 Hubert Hurkacz, Polish tennis player
 Rosé, New Zealand singer
 February 14
 Jaehyun, South Korean singer and actor
 Breel Embolo, Swiss footballer
 February 21 –
 Ben Rhodes, American professional stock car racing driver 
 Malik Newman, American professional basketball player 
 February 22 – Anton Chupkov, Russian swimmer
 February 23
 Érick Aguirre, Mexican footballer
 Jamal Murray, Canadian basketball player
 February 24 – César Montes, Mexican footballer
 February 25
 Isabelle Fuhrman, American actress
 Santiago Ascacíbar, Argentinian footballer
 Katsiaryna Halkina, Belarusian rhythmic gymnast
 February 26 – Zheng Siwei, Chinese badminton player

March

 March 2 – Becky G, American singer
 March 3
 Camila Cabello, Cuban-American singer
 David Neres, Brazilian footballer
 March 4 – Matisse Thybulle, American basketball player
 March 5 – Romain Lagarde, French handball player
 March 6 
 Alisha Boe, Norwegian actress
 Bojana Milenković, Serbian volleyball player
 March 8
 March 9
BTS Min Yoongi 
 Tijana Bošković, Serbian volleyball player
 Jurina Matsui, Japanese singer
 March 10 – Belinda Bencic, Swiss tennis player
 March 13 – Rúben Neves, Portuguese footballer
 March 14
 Simone Biles, American gymnast
 Dawid Kownacki, Polish footballer
 Harrie Lavreysen, Dutch track cyclist
 March 17
 Konrad Bukowiecki, Polish athlete
 Katie Ledecky, American swimmer
 Nijirō Murakami, Japanese actor
 March 18
 Ciara Bravo, American actress, voice artist, singer, and comedian
 Mario Burke, Barbadian sprinter
 March 19 – Rūta Meilutytė, Lithuanian swimmer
 March 21 – Martina Stoessel, Argentine actress, singer, dancer, and model
 March 22 – Harry Wilson, Welsh footballer
 March 23 – Thiago Maia, Brazilian footballer
 March 24 – Mina, Japanese singer and dancer
 March 27 – Lisa, Thai rapper, singer, dancer, and model
 March 30
 Gideon Adlon, American actress
 Cha Eun-woo, South Korean singer
Shervin Hajipour, Iranian singer

April

 April 1 – Asa Butterfield, English actor
 April 3 – Gabriel Jesus, Brazilian footballer
 April 6 – Pavel Zacha, Czech ice hockey player
 April 8 – Roquan Smith, American football player
 April 9 – Michael Špaček, Czech ice hockey player
 April 11 – Mélovin, Ukrainian singer-songwriter
 April 12 – Katelyn Ohashi, American artistic gymnast
 April 14 – D. J. Moore, American football player
 April 15 – Maisie Williams, English actress
 April 16 – Daniel Rioli, Australian rules footballer
 April 18 – Donny van de Beek, Dutch footballer
 April 20 – Alexander Zverev, German tennis player
 April 21 – Mikel Oyarzabal, Spanish footballer
 April 23
 Zach Apple, American swimmer
 Peng Cheng, Chinese figure skater
 April 24
 Lydia Ko, South Korean-born New Zealand golfer
 Veronika Kudermetova, Russian tennis player
 April 26 – Moritz Wagner, German basketball player
 April 27 
 Livio Loi, Belgian motorcycle racer
 Nellys Pimentel, Puerto Rican model and beauty queen who was crowned Miss Earth 2019.
 April 28 – Denzel Ward, American football player
 April 30 – T. J. Leaf, American basketball player

May

 May 2 – BamBam, Thai singer
 May 3 – Desiigner, American rapper and singer
 May 4 – Ben Dolic, Slovenian singer
 May 5 – Mitch Marner, Canadian ice hockey player
 May 6 – Duncan Scott, Scottish swimmer
 May 7
 Daria Kasatkina, Russian tennis player
 Youri Tielemans, Belgian footballer
 May 10
 Richarlison, Brazilian footballer
 Enes Ünal, Turkish footballer
 May 11 – Lana Condor, American actress and dancer
 May 12
 Frenkie de Jong, Dutch footballer
 Morgan Lake, English athlete
 Odeya Rush, Israeli-born American actress
 May 14 – Manushi Chhillar, Indian model, actress and Miss World 2017
 May 15 – Ousmane Dembélé, French footballer
 May 19
 Oliver Kylington, Swedish ice hockey player
 Víctor Robles, Dominican baseball outfielder
 May 21 – Kevin Quinn, American actor
 May 22 – Lauri Markkanen, Finnish basketball player
 May 23 – Joe Gomez, English footballer
 May 27
 Daron Payne, American football player
 Liam Nolan, British Muay Thai kickboxer
 May 30 – Jake Short, American actor
 May 31 – Cupcakke, American rapper

June

 June 1 – Youssef En-Nesyri, Moroccan footballer
 June 5
 Sam Darnold, American football quarterback
 Henry Onyekuru, Nigerian footballer
 June 6 – Maja Aleksić, Serbian volleyball player
 June 7 – David Montgomery, American football player
 June 8 – Jeļena Ostapenko, Latvian tennis player
 June 9 – Shen Duo, Chinese swimmer
 June 10 – Sviatoslav Mykhailiuk, Ukrainian basketball player
 June 11
 Kodak Black, American hip-hop artist
 Jorja Smith, English singer
 June 13
 Katie Lou Samuelson, American basketball player
 Yuta Watanabe, Japanese badminton player
 June 14 – Fujii Kaze, Japanese singer-songwriter
 June 15 – Madison Kocian, American artistic gymnast
 June 16 
 Orlane Kanor, French handball player
 Camila Morrone, American-Argentine model and actress
 June 17 
 KJ Apa, New Zealand actor
 Alexander Bublik, Russian born-Kazakh tennis player
 June 21 – Rebecca Black, American singer
 June 22 – Dinah Jane, American singer
 June 23
 Chen Qingchen, Chinese badminton player
 Antoine Olivier Pilon, French-Canadian actor
 June 25
 Rodrigo Bentancur, Uruguayan footballer
 Bassem Srarfi, Tunisian footballer
 June 27
 H.E.R., American singer
 Shannon Purser, American actress
 June 28 – Shakur Stevenson, American boxer
 June 29 – Jia Yifan, Chinese badminton player
 June 30 – Avika Gor, Indian actress

July

 July 2 
 Marquese Chriss, American basketball player 
 Jackie Buntan, Filipino-American Muay Thai kickboxer and former ONE Women's Stawweight Muay Thai title challenger
 July 3 – Georgios Papagiannis, Greek basketball player
 July 4 – Daniela Nieves, Venezuelan-American actress
 July 7 – Magnus Abelvik Rød, Norwegian handball player
 July 10 
 Ebba Andersson, Swedish cross-country skier
 Alba Baptista, Portuguese actress
 July 12 – Malala Yousafzai, Pakistani activist and Nobel Prize laureate
 July 13 – Leo Howard, American actor and martial artist
 July 14 – Cengiz Ünder, Turkish footballer
 July 17 – Amadou Diawara, Guinese footballer
 July 18
 Bam Adebayo, American basketball player
 Chiara Kreuzer, Austrian ski jumper
 Noah Lyles, American sprinter
 Fionn Whitehead, English actor
 July 19 – Zach Werenski, American ice hockey player
 July 24 – Emre Mor, Turkish footballer
 July 26 – Ewa Swoboda, Polish track and field sprinter 
 July 27 – Rai Benjamin, American hurdler
 July 30
 Teófimo López, American boxer
 Finneas O'Connell, American musician and actor
 July 31 – Jordyn Poulter, American volleyball player

August

 August 2
 Ke Jie, Chinese professional go player
 Triston McKenzie, American baseball pitcher
 Christina Robinson, American actress
 August 3 – Ronald Jones II, American football player
 August 5
 Olivia Holt, American actress and singer
 Adam Irigoyen, American actor
 August 7 – Kyler Murray, American football player
 August 9 – Leon Bailey, Jamaican footballer
 August 10 – Kylie Jenner, American reality television personality
 August 16
 Greyson Chance, American singer, songwriter and pianist
 Piper Curda, American actress
 August 18
 Josephine Langford, Australian actress
 Renato Sanches, Portuguese footballer
 August 19 – Florian Wellbrock, German swimmer
 August 22 – Lautaro Martínez, Argentine footballer
 August 23 – Lil Yachty, American rapper, singer and songwriter
 August 24 – Alan Walker, British-Norwegian music producer
 August 28 – Bazzi, American singer-songwriter
 August 31 – Dika Mem, French handball player

September

 September 1 
 Joan Mir, Spanish Grand Prix motorcycle racer
 Jungkook, South Korean singer, member of BTS
 September 2 – Brandon Ingram, American basketball player
 September 3 – Hana Kimura, Japanese professional wrestler (d. 2020)
 September 7 – Dean-Charles Chapman, English actor
 September 9 – Yahia Omar, Egyptian handball player
 September 12 – Sydney Sweeney, American actress
 September 14 – Benjamin Ingrosso, Swedish singer-songwriter
 September 15 – Jonatan Christie, Indonesian badminton player
 September 16
 Elena Kampouris, American actress
 Jackie Young, American basketball player
 September 17
 Luke Greenbank, British swimmer
 Guan Xiaotong, Chinese actress
 Auston Matthews, American ice hockey player 
 September 19 – Chase Jeter, American basketball player 
 September 23 – John Collins, American basketball player 
 September 30
 Yana Kudryavtseva, Russian rhythmic gymnast
 Max Verstappen, Dutch racing driver

October

 October 1 –
 Jade Bird, English singer-songwriter 
 Dedric Lawson, American professional basketball player 
 October 3 – Jonathan Isaac, American professional basketball player
 October 6 – Kasper Dolberg, Danish footballer
 October 7 – Kira Kosarin, American actress and singer
 October 8
 Steven Bergwijn, Dutch footballer
 Marco Odermatt, Swiss alpine skier
 Bella Thorne, American actress and singer
 October 10 – Fabricio Andrade, Brazilian mixed martial artist, former Muay Thai kickboxer, and ONE Bantamweight World Champion
 October 16
 Charles Leclerc, Monégasque racing driver
 Naomi Osaka, Japanese tennis player
 October 20 – Andrey Rublev, Russian tennis player
 October 21 – Anderson Peters, Grenadian javelin thrower
 October 25 – Federico Chiesa, Italian footballer
 October 27 – Lonzo Ball, American basketball player
 October 28 
 Taylor Fritz, American tennis player
 Sierra McCormick, American actress
 October 31 – Marcus Rashford, English footballer and activist

November

 November 1 – Alex Wolff, American singer-songwriter, musician, and actor
 November 3 – Lázaro Martínez, Cuban triple jumper
 November 4 – Bea Binene, Filipino actress
 November 6 – Hero Fiennes Tiffin, English actor and model
 November 7 - The8, Chinese singer and dancer
 November 10 – Daniel James, English-born Welsh footballer
 November 16 – Stamp Fairtex, Thai Muay Thai kickboxer, mixed martial artist and former two-sport and current MMA grand-prix world champion
 November 19 – Grant Holloway, American hurdler
 November 23 – Akari Takeuchi, Japanese singer 
 November 25 – Dennis Smith Jr., American professional basketball player 
 November 26 – Aubrey Joseph, American actor and rapper 
 November 28 – Yuliya Levchenko, Ukrainian high jumper
 November 29 – William Byron, American racing driver
 November 30 – Liu Huixia, Chinese diver

December

 December 2 – Afra Saraçoğlu, Turkish actress and model
 December 3 – Michael Norman, American sprinter
 December 5
 Khaleel Ahmed, Indian cricketer
 Clara Rugaard, Danish actress and singer
 December 14 – DK Metcalf, American football wide receiver
 December 15 – Maude Apatow, American actress
 December 16
 Zara Larsson, Swedish singer and songwriter
 Bassam Al-Rawi, Iraqi-born Qatari footballer
 December 17 – Shoma Uno, Japanese figure skater
 December 18 – Ronald Acuña Jr., Venezuelan baseball outfielder
 December 20
 De'Aaron Fox, American basketball player
 Suzuka Nakamoto, Japanese singer
 December 21 
 Madelyn Cline, American actress
 Charlie McAvoy, American ice hockey player
 December 22 – Taylor Rapp, American football player
 December 23
 Luka Jović, Serbian footballer
 Park Yoo-na, South Korean actress
 December 24 — Stefan Airapetjan, Estonian Singer
 December 27 – Vachirawit Chivaaree, Thai actor and singer

Deaths

January

 January 1 – Townes Van Zandt, American folk singer (b. 1944)
 January 5
 Bertil, Swedish prince, Duke of Halland (b. 1912)
 Burton Lane, American composer and lyricist (b. 1912)
 January 6 
 Teiichi Matsumaru, Japanese footballer (b. 1909)
 Catherine Scorsese, Italian-American actress (b. 1912)
 January 8 – Melvin Calvin, American chemist (b. 1911)
 January 9 
 Edward Osóbka-Morawski, Polish politician (b. 1909)
 Jesse White, American actor (b. 1917)
 January 10
 Sheldon Leonard, American actor, director, and producer (b. 1907)
 Alexander R. Todd, Scottish chemist (b. 1907)
 January 12 – Charles Brenton Huggins, Canadian-born cancer researcher (b. 1901)
 January 14 – King Hu, Chinese film director and actor (b. 1932)
 January 17 
 Amha Selassie, Emperor of Ethiopia (b. 1916)
 Clyde Tombaugh, American astronomer (b. 1906)
 January 18 
 Adriana Caselotti, American actress, voice actress and singer (b. 1916)
 Paul Tsongas, American politician (b. 1941)
 January 19 – James Dickey, American poet and novelist (b. 1923)
 January 21
 Colonel Tom Parker, Dutch-born celebrity manager (b. 1909)
 Polly Ann Young, American actress (b. 1908)
 January 25 – Jeane Dixon, American astrologer (b. 1904)
 January 28 – Mikel Koliqi, Albanian cardinal (b. 1900)

February

 February 1 – Marjorie Reynolds, American actress (b. 1917)
 February 5 – Pamela Harriman, American diplomat (b. 1920)
 February 9 
 Brian Connolly, Scottish musician (b. 1945)
 Barry Evans, English actor (b. 1943)
 February 10 – Milton Cato, Prime Minister of Saint Vincent and the Grenadines (b. 1915)
 February 19 – Deng Xiaoping, Chinese revolutionary, communist leader, and statesman (b. 1904)
 February 23 – Tony Williams, American musician (b. 1945)
 February 26 – David Doyle, American actor (b. 1929)

March

 March 4 – Robert H. Dicke, American experimental physicist (b. 1916)
 March 6
 Cheddi Jagan, President of Guyana (b. 1918)
 Michael Manley, 2-Time Prime Minister of Jamaica (b. 1924)
 March 7
 Edward Mills Purcell, American physicist (b. 1912)
 Martin Kippenberger, German artist (b. 1953)
 March 9
 The Notorious B.I.G., American rapper (b. 1972)
 Terry Nation, Welsh screenwriter (b. 1930)
 Jean-Dominique Bauby, French journalist and author (b. 1952)
 March 10 – LaVern Baker, American singer (b. 1929)
 March 11 – Lars Ahlin, Swedish author and aesthetician (b. 1915)
 March 14 
 Jurek Becker, Polish-born German writer (b. 1937)
 Fred Zinnemann, Austrian-born American film director (b. 1907)
 March 15 – Victor Vasarely, Hungarian-French artist (b. 1906)
 March 17 – Jermaine Stewart, American singer (b. 1957)
 March 19 – Willem de Kooning, Dutch artist (b. 1904)
 March 20 – Tony Zale, American boxer (b. 1913)
 March 21 – Wilbert Awdry, British children's writer (b. 1911)
 March 26 – Marshall Applewhite, American cult leader (b. 1931)
 March 31 
 Friedrich Hund, German physicist (b. 1896)
 Lyman Spitzer, American theoretical physicist and astronomer (b. 1914)

April

 April 4 – Alparslan Türkeş, Turkish politician (b. 1917)
 April 5 
 Allen Ginsberg, American poet (b. 1926)
 Ignazio Buttitta, Sicilian dialectal poet (b. 1899)
 April 8 – Laura Nyro, American singer and composer (b. 1947)
 April 7 – Georgy Shonin, Russian cosmonaut (b. 1935)
 April 12 – George Wald, American scientist (b. 1906)
 April 13 – Shuhei Nishida, Japanese athlete (b. 1910)
 April 16 – Roland Topor, French illustrator (b. 1938)
 April 17 – Chaim Herzog, Israel politician, 6th President of Israel (b. 1918)
 April 20 – Jean Louis, American costume designer (b. 1907)
 April 21
 Andrés Rodríguez, 47th President of Paraguay (b. 1923)
 Diosdado Macapagal, 9th President of the Philippines (b. 1910)
April 23 - Denis Compton, English cricketer (b. 1918)
 April 24 – Eugene Stoner, American firearms designer and engineer (b. 1922)
 April 26 – John Beal, American actor (b. 1909)

May

 May 1 – Bo Widerberg, Swedish film director (b. 1930)
 May 2
 John Eccles, Australian neurophysiologist (b. 1903)
 Paulo Freire, Brazilian educator and philosopher (b. 1921)
 May 3, Narciso Yepes, Spanish guitarist (b. 1927)
 May 4 – Wijeyananda Dahanayake, 5th Prime Minister of Sri Lanka (b. 1901)
 May 5 – Walter Gotell, German actor (b. 1924)
 May 13 – Laurie Lee, English author (b. 1914)
 May 16 – Giuseppe De Santis, Italian film director (b. 1917)
 May 20 – Virgilio Barco Vargas, 27th President of Colombia (b. 1921)
 May 22 – Alfred Hershey, American biochemist (b. 1908)
 May 24 – Edward Mulhare, Irish actor (b. 1923)
 May 26 – Manfred von Ardenne, German physicist and inventor (b. 1907)
 May 29 – Jeff Buckley, American musician (b. 1966)

June

 June 1 
 Robert Serber, American physicist (b. 1909)
 Nikolai Tikhonov, Soviet-Russian statesman (b. 1905)
 June 2 – Helen Jacobs, American tennis champion (b. 1908)
 June 4 – Ronnie Lane, English musician (b. 1946)
 June 6 – Magda Gabor, Hungarian-American actress (b. 1915)
 June 12 – Bulat Okudzhava, Soviet singer (b. 1924)
 June 14 – Richard Jaeckel, American actor (b. 1926)
 June 15 
 Edmond Leburton, 42nd Prime Minister of Belgium (b. 1915)
 Son Sen, Cambodian politician and criminal (b. 1930)
 June 18 
 Lev Kopelev, Soviet writer and dissident (b. 1912)
 Héctor Yazalde, Argentine footballer (b. 1946)
 June 21 – Shintaro Katsu, Japanese actor, singer, producer, and director (b. 1931)
 June 22 – Ted Gärdestad, Swedish singer, songwriter, and musician (b. 1956)
 June 23 – Betty Shabazz, American educator and activist (b. 1934)
 June 24
 Don Hutson, American football player (b. 1913)
 Brian Keith, American actor (b. 1921)
 June 25 – Jacques Cousteau, French explorer (b. 1910)
 June 26 – Israel Kamakawiwoʻole, Hawaiian singer (b. 1959)
 June 29 – William Hickey, American actor (b. 1927)

July

 July 1 – Robert Mitchum, American actor (b. 1917)
 July 2 – James Stewart, American actor and soldier (b. 1908)
 July 8 – Abu Sadat Mohammad Sayem, 6th President of Bangladesh (b. 1916)
 July 9 – Aurelio González, Paraguayan footballer (b. 1905)
 July 13 – Alexandra Danilova, Russian-American ballerina and dance instructor (b. 1903)
 July 15 – Gianni Versace, Italian fashion designer (b. 1946)
 July 17 – Robert C. Weaver, American economist and academic (b. 1907)
 July 18 – Eugene Merle Shoemaker, American astronomer (b. 1928)
 July 20 – John Akii-Bua, Ugandan hurdler (b. 1949)
 July 23
 Andrew Cunanan, American serial killer (b. 1969)
 Chūhei Nambu, Japanese athlete (b. 1904)
 July 24 – Frank Parker, American tennis champion (b. 1916)
 July 25 – Ben Hogan, American golf champion (b. 1912)
 July 26 – Jaime Milans del Bosch, Spanish general and insurgent (b. 1915)
 July 28 
 Rosalie Crutchley, English actress (b. 1920)
 Seni Pramoj, Thai politician, 6th Prime Minister of Thailand (b. 1905)
 July 30 – Bảo Đại, Emperor of Vietnam (b. 1913)

August

 August 1
 Ngiratkel Etpison, 5th President of Palau (b. 1925)
 Sviatoslav Richter, Ukrainian pianist (b. 1915)
 August 2
 William S. Burroughs, American author (b. 1914)
 Fela Kuti, Nigerian musician and political activist (b. 1938)
 August 4 – Jeanne Calment, French supercentenarian, oldest person ever lived (b. 1875)
 August 6 – Jürgen Kuczynski, German economist and communist (b. 1904)
 August 10 – Conlon Nancarrow, American-born composer (b. 1912)
 August 12 – Luther Allison, American musician (b. 1939)
 August 16 – Sultan Ahmad Nanupuri, Bangladeshi Islamic scholar and teacher (b. 1914)
 August 20 – Norris Bradbury, American physicist (b. 1909)
 August 21 
 Misael Pastrana Borrero, 23rd President of Colombia (b. 1923)
 Yuri Nikulin, Soviet and Russian actor and clown (b. 1921)
 August 22 – Matti Sippala, Finnish athlete (b. 1908)
 August 23 
 Eric Gairy, 1st Prime Minister of Grenada (b. 1922)
 John Kendrew, British molecular biologist (b. 1917)
 August 24 – Louis Essen, English physicist (b. 1908)
 August 27 – Sally Blane, American actress (b. 1910)
 August 30 – Ernst Wilimowski, German–Polish footballer (b. 1916)
 August 31 
 Diana, Princess of Wales (b. 1961)
 Dodi Fayed, Egyptian film producer (b. 1955)

September

 September 1 – Zoltán Czibor, Hungarian footballer (b. 1929)
 September 2 – Viktor Frankl,  Austrian neurologist and psychiatrist (b. 1905)
 September 4 
 Hans Eysenck, German-born British psychologist (b. 1916)
 Aldo Rossi, Italian architect and designer (b. 1931)
 September 5
 Sir Georg Solti, Hungarian-born British conductor (b. 1912)
 Mother Teresa, Albanian-born Indian nun, missionary and saint (b. 1910)
 September 7 – Mobutu Sese Seko, 2nd President of Zaire (b. 1930)
 September 9 – Burgess Meredith, American actor (b. 1907)
 September 10 – Fritz Von Erich, American professional wrestler (b. 1929)
 September 12 – Stig Anderson, Swedish talent manager (b. 1931)
 September 17 
 Red Skelton, American actor and comedian (b. 1913)
 Jan P. Syse, Norwegian politician, Prime Minister of Norway (b. 1930)
 September 18 – Jimmy Witherspoon, American blues singer (b. 1920)
 September 19 – Rich Mullins, American Christian musician (b. 1955)
 September 23 – Shirley Clarke, American filmmaker (b. 1919)
 September 25 – Jean Françaix, French composer (b. 1912)
 September 28 – Ho Feng-Shan, Chinese diplomat (b. 1901)
 September 29 – Roy Lichtenstein, American artist (b. 1923)

October

 October 1 – Francisco Aramburu, Brazilian footballer (b. 1922)
 October 4
 Otto Ernst Remer, German Wehrmacht officer (b. 1912)
 Gunpei Yokoi, Japanese video game franchise creator (b. 1941)
 October 5 – Brian Pillman, American professional wrestler (b. 1962)
 October 7 − Orlando Ramón Agosti, Argentine general (b. 1924)
 October 11 – Ivan Yarygin, Soviet and Russian heavyweight wrestler (b. 1948)
 October 12 – John Denver, American musician (b. 1943)
 October 13 – Adil Çarçani, Albanian politician (b. 1922)
 October 14 – Harold Robbins, American writer (b. 1916)
 October 16
 Princess Olga of Greece and Denmark (b. 1903)
 Audra Lindley, American actress (b. 1918)
 James A. Michener, American writer (b. 1907)
 October 19
 Glen Buxton, American guitarist (b. 1947)
 Pilar Miró, Spanish screenwriter and film director (b. 1940)
 October 23
Bert Haanstra, Dutch filmmaker (b. 1916)
Luther Simjian, Armenian-American inventor (b. 1905)
 October 29 – Anton LaVey, American author, musician, and occultist (b. 1930)
 October 30 – Samuel Fuller, American screenwriter and director (b. 1912)

November

 November 2 – Shōshin Nagamine, Japanese author and soldier, police officer, and karate master (b. 1907)
 November 5 – Isaiah Berlin, Russian-British social and political theorist (b. 1909)
 November 8 – Mohammad-Ali Jamalzadeh, Iranian author (b. 1892)
 November 9 - Carl Gustav Hempel, German philosopher from the Vienna and the Berlin Circle (b. 1905)
 November 11 – Rod Milburn, American athlete (b. 1950)
 November 16 - George O. Petrie, American actor and director (b. 1912)
 November 21 – Robert Simpson, English composer (b. 1921)
 November 22
 Joanna Moore, American actress (b. 1934)
 Michael Hutchence, Australian singer-songwriter (b. 1960)
 November 24 – Barbara, French singer (b. 1930)
 November 25 – Hastings Banda, 1st President of Malawi (b. 1898)
 November 30 – Kathy Acker, American author (b. 1947)

December

 December 1 – Stéphane Grappelli, French violinist (b. 1908)
 December 2 – Michael Hedges, American composer and guitarist (b. 1953)
 December 7 – Billy Bremner, British footballer (b. 1942)
 December 14 
 Stubby Kaye, American actor (b. 1918)
 Owen Barfield, British philosopher, poet, and critic (b. 1898)
 December 16 
 Lillian Disney, American artist (b. 1899)
 Nicolette Larson, American pop singer (b. 1952)
 December 18 – Chris Farley, American actor and comedian (b. 1964)
 December 19
 Masaru Ibuka, Japanese electronics industrialist (b. 1908)
 Jimmy Rogers, American musician (b. 1924)
 December 20
 Juzo Itami, Japanese film director (b. 1933)
 Denise Levertov, English-born American poet (b. 1923)
 December 23 – Stanley Cortez, American cinematographer (b. 1908)
 December 24 – Toshiro Mifune, Japanese actor (b. 1920)
 December 25
 Denver Pyle, American actor (b. 1920)
 Anita Conti, French explorer and photographer (b. 1899)
 Anatoli Boukreev, Russian mountain climber (b. 1958)
 December 31 – Billie Dove, American actress (b. 1903)

Nobel Prizes

 Chemistry – Paul D. Boyer, John E. Walker, Jens C. Skou
 Economics – Bank of Sweden – Robert C. Merton, Myron Scholes
 Literature – Dario Fo
 Peace – International Campaign to Ban Landmines and Jody Williams
 Physics – Steven Chu, Claude Cohen-Tannoudji, William D. Phillips
 Medicine – Stanley B. Prusiner

References

External links
 1997 Year in Review – CNN